Marjory Saunders (March 10, 1913 – November 26, 2010) was a Canadian archer who competed in the Olympic games in 1972 in Munich. She was born in Sussex, England and died in Maple Ridge, British Columbia. She competed in the 1972 Summer Olympics in Women's individual archery competition and placed 32nd.

References

1913 births
2010 deaths
Canadian female archers
Olympic archers of Canada
Archers at the 1972 Summer Olympics
British emigrants to Canada